The 2019–20 Texas Tech Lady Raiders basketball team represented Texas Tech University in the 2019–20 NCAA Division I women's basketball season. The Lady Raiders were led by second year head coach Marlene Stollings. They played their homes games at United Supermarkets Arena and were members of the Big 12 Conference.

They finished the season 18–11, 7–11 in Big 12 play to finish tied for sixth place. They were scheduled to be the seventh seed in the Big 12 Tournament, but it was cancelled before it began due to the COVID-19 pandemic.  The NCAA women's basketball tournament and WNIT were also canceled.

Media

Television & Radio information
Select Lady Raiders games will be shown on FSN affiliates throughout the season, including FSSW, FSSW+, and FCS Atlantic, Central, and Pacific. All games will be broadcast on the Lady Raiders Radio Network on either KLZK or KJTV.

Roster

Schedule

Source:

|-
!colspan=12 style=| Non-conference regular season

|-
!colspan=12 style=| Big 12 regular season

|-
!colspan=12 style=| Big 12 Women's Tournament

Rankings

See also
2019–20 Texas Tech Red Raiders basketball team

References

Texas Tech Lady Raiders basketball seasons
Texas Tech
Texas Tech
Texas Tech